is a Japanese singer and voice actress. She made her debut as a voice actress in the anime television series School Rumble.

Discography

Albums

Singles

Other singles
 "Otomegokoro Mugen" (2008) on Tribute to Masami Okui Buddy album

Filmography

Anime

Video games

Audio dramas

Dubbing

References

External links
  (archive) 

1982 births
Japanese voice actresses
Living people
Anime musicians
Musicians from Saitama Prefecture